The white-bellied whistler (Pachycephala leucogastra) is a species of bird in the family Pachycephalidae.
The species has an oddly discontinuous distribution, occurring in two small patches of northern New Guinea, one small patch in south eastern New Guinea and on Rossel Island in the Louisiade Archipelago (off the tip of eastern New Guinea). The species uses a variety of habitats, including wet eucalyptus forests, mangrove forests, savanna, and modified habitats like rubber plantations.

Taxonomy and systematics
The name 'white-bellied whistler' is also used as an alternate name for the mangrove whistler, white-vented whistler, rufous whistler and the white-breasted whistler.

Subspecies 
Two subspecies are recognized:
 P. l. leucogastra – Salvadori & D'Albertis, 1875: Found in southeastern New Guinea
 P. l. meeki – Hartert, 1898: Originally described as a separate species. Found on Rossel Island (Louisiade Archipelago)

References

white-bellied whistler
Endemic fauna of New Guinea
Birds of New Guinea
white-bellied whistler
Taxa named by Luigi D'Albertis
Taxonomy articles created by Polbot